Carabus marietti stefaniruspolii is a subspecies of beetle from the family Carabidae, that is endemic to Turkey.

References

marietti stefaniruspolii
Beetles described in 1966
Endemic fauna of Turkey